Outlaws) is the second album by Luke Doucet, released in 2004 in Canada.

Outlaws is a collection of live songs and two unreleased studio recordings.  Most of the album was recorded on February 10 and 11, 2004 at the Rivoli in Toronto.

Track listing 
"Emily, Please"
"Outlaws"
"Buttercloud"
"Pedro"
"Judy Garland"
"Gun St. Girl"
"Another Woman"
"Spiderman"
"Annie Lu"
"At the End of the Day"

References 

Luke Doucet albums
2004 live albums
Six Shooter Records live albums